Barguna-2 is a constituency represented in the Jatiya Sangsad (National Parliament) of Bangladesh since 2013 by Showkat Hasanur Rahman of the Awami League.

Boundaries 
The constituency encompasses Bamna, Betagi, and Patharghata upazilas.

History 
The constituency was created in 1984 from the Patuakhali-1 constituency when the former Patuakhali District was split into two districts: Barguna and Patuakhali.

Ahead of the 2008 general election, the Election Commission redrew constituency boundaries to reflect population changes revealed by the 2001 Bangladesh census. The 2008 redistricting altered the boundaries of the constituency.

Members of Parliament

Elections

Elections in the 2010s 

Golam Sabur Tulu died in July 2013. Showkat Hasanur Rahman of the Awami League was elected in an October by-election.

Elections in the 2000s

Elections in the 1990s

References

External links
 

Parliamentary constituencies in Bangladesh
Barguna District